Alfredo Fernández Moreno (born 30 January 1947) is a Mexican politician affiliated with the National Action Party. As of 2014 he served as Deputy of the LIX Legislature of the Mexican Congress as a plurinominal representative.

References

1947 births
Living people
Politicians from San Luis Potosí
Members of the Chamber of Deputies (Mexico)
National Action Party (Mexico) politicians
Members of the Congress of San Luis Potosí
20th-century Mexican politicians
21st-century Mexican politicians
Deputies of the LIX Legislature of Mexico